Emil Assad Rached (June 20, 1943 Vera Cruz, São Paulo, Brasil – October 15, 2009 Campinas,  São Paulo, Brazil) was a Brazilian basketball player of Lebanese origin. In Brazil, he was commonly referred to as O Gigante ("The Giant").

He started his career in Palmeiras in 1964 and played basketball professionally up to 1980 for five more teams: XV de Piracicaba (SP), Corinthians (SP), Botafogo (RJ), Tênis Cube de Campinas (SP) and Rio Claro (SP). Rached participated at the 1967 FIBA World Championship with the Brazil national basketball team. At 2.20 meters (7 ft 3 in), he was the tallest Brazilian player ever. For five years, he was part of the Brazilian national team. He won a bronze medal at the World Championships in Uruguay (1967), a gold medal in the Pan American Games in Cali (1971) and placed second in South America Argentina (1966). He scored 114 points in 18 official matches for Brazil. 

After retiring from basketball, he had an acting career, most notably participation in a very popular Brazilian comedy TV show called Os Trapalhões and some movies with the same group.

References

1943 births
2009 deaths
Brazilian people of Lebanese descent
Brazilian men's basketball players
1967 FIBA World Championship players
Centers (basketball)
Pan American Games medalists in basketball
Pan American Games gold medalists for Brazil
Sociedade Esportiva Palmeiras basketball players
Sport Club Corinthians Paulista basketball players
Basketball players at the 1971 Pan American Games
Medalists at the 1971 Pan American Games
Sportspeople of Lebanese descent
Basketball players from São Paulo